International Women's Film Festival In Rehovot (Hebrew: הפסטיבל הבינלאומי לסרטי נשים רחובות) is a film festival that occurred from 2004 to 2014 in the city of Rehovot, Israel. The purpose of the festival was to promote films made by women.

Background 
The festival was organized by the Women in the Picture Association with support from the Municipality of Rehovot.

The festival was intended to provide a platform for the voice and vision of women filmmakers from Israel and abroad, and create direct connections between creators, dialog among women on a variety of topics, and an opportunity for audiences to see different types of films.

Four competitions were held in the festival Best Feature (until 2011 there were three, that year the Narrative Film award was split into Feature and Short), Best Short Fiction Film, Best Documentary, and Most Promising Filmmaker. In addition, a grant was awarded annually for the development of a full-length feature film, sponsored by the Yehoshua Rabinowitz Foundation for the Arts in Tel Aviv.

In addition to the film screenings, the festival included workshops, panels, lectures, and additional events.

In 2014, the city of Rehovot decided to cancel the festival.

History

See also 
International Women's Film Festival (disambiguation)
 List of women's film festivals

Resources

External links 

 Festival website (archived)
Women's film festivals
Film festivals in Israel
Film festivals established in 2004